Paul Bitok (born 26 June 1970 in Kilibwoni, Nandi) is a Kenyan long-distance runner, who won two silver medals at consecutive Summer Olympics (1992, 1996) over 5000 metres.

Life
Bitok emerged in 1992 as a relatively unknown athlete. He qualified for the Barcelona Games at the Kenyan trials and defeated several world class athletes at the Bislett Games in Oslo. By the time of the Olympics he had established himself as one of the favourites. He narrowly lost the final to Dieter Baumann of Germany. A few weeks later he won the 5000 m race in Zurich. In the following years Bitok did not match his performances of 1992. However, by 1996 he was back and won another silver in Atlanta. He also won two World Indoor silvers (1997, 1999) in the 3000 metres behind Haile Gebrselassie.

He is married to Pauline Konga, who won the silver medal in women's 5000 metres at the 1996 Olympics, becoming the first Kenyan female Olympic medalist.

References

External links
 

1970 births
Living people
People from Nandi County
Kenyan male long-distance runners
Kenyan male middle-distance runners
Olympic athletes of Kenya
Olympic silver medalists for Kenya
Athletes (track and field) at the 1992 Summer Olympics
Athletes (track and field) at the 1996 Summer Olympics
Medalists at the 1996 Summer Olympics
Medalists at the 1992 Summer Olympics
World Athletics Championships athletes for Kenya
Olympic silver medalists in athletics (track and field)
Goodwill Games medalists in athletics
Competitors at the 2001 Goodwill Games
Competitors at the 1994 Goodwill Games
Goodwill Games gold medalists in athletics